Jean LeClerc (1587/88 – buried 20 October 1633) was a 17th-century painter from the Duchy of Lorraine.  His style was Baroque, or more specifically "tenebrist".  Only six authenticated paintings remain of LeClerc’s work, but numerous etchings and engravings have survived.

LeClerc was born and died at Nancy.  He studied with the Venetian master Carlo Saraceni.  LeClerc is known for his mastery of nocturnal light effects, and the luminosity of his scenes.

References
 Myers, Bernard S. (1969) "Le Clerc, Jean (1587?-1633)" McGraw-Hill Dictionary of Art McGraw-Hill, New York;
 Gealt, Adelheid M. (1993) Painting of the Golden Age: a biographical dictionary of seventeenth-century European painters Greenwood Press, Westport, CT,  ;
 Langmuir, Erika and Lynton, Norbert (2000) "LeClerc, Jean" The Yale Dictionary of Art and Artists Yale University Press, New Haven, CT;

External links
 

1580s births
1633 deaths
French Baroque painters
Artists from Nancy, France
People from Lorraine (duchy)
French male painters
Caravaggisti